Joseph Ferdinand Corré (born 30 November 1967) is a British activist and businessman, who co-founded Agent Provocateur in 1994.

Early years
Corré was born in Clapham, south London, the son of British fashion designer Dame Vivienne Westwood and Malcolm McLaren, former manager of Sex Pistols.

Corré's surname, which was not adopted but given at birth, derives from his father's maternal grandmother, a Sephardic Jew from Portugal. As a child, he wore his mother's designs and regards the Sex Pistols as his favourite band, despite a poor relationship with frontman/singer John Lydon.

Agent Provocateur
Agent Provocateur was established in 1994 after Serena Rees, Corré's wife and co-founder, grew tired of seeing drab undergarments. The couple opened a shop in which they originally sold other designers' pieces. Corré had no desire to design lingerie but, after not finding enough of the type they wished to sell, decided to create their own lingerie line. Since then, the company has expanded to 30 shops in 14 countries. 

Rees left Corré for ex-Clash bassist Paul Simonon in 2007, and in the same year the to-be divorced couple agreed to sell Agent Provocateur to private equity house 3i for £60m.

Rejection of MBE 
In June 2007, Corré was awarded the MBE for his services to the fashion industry in the Queen's Birthday Honours list. He rejected the award in protest at Prime Minister Tony Blair's actions in Iraq and Afghanistan which Corré said had caused suffering and at the erosion in civil rights in the UK during Blair's term.

A Child of the Jago
In 2008 Corré founded the opening of the independent boutique "A Child of the Jago", named after the 19th century novel by Arthur Morrison. The venture was a partnership with British street-wear fashion entrepreneur Simon "Barnzley" Armitage, modelled on the retail outlets run by Corré's parents in the 1970s/80s. Armitage left the business in 2013 and is no longer referenced in the company's history.

Illamasqua
In 2010 Corré was recruited to "edgy" British cosmetics company Illamasqua as brand director by founder Julian Kynaston. The company has an expanding chain of outlets in the UK and an international presence.

Relationship with father
On McLaren's death in a Swiss medical centre from a rare form of cancer in April 2010, Corré said: "It was hard for me because he never wanted to do the emotional stuff that comes with being a parent. He ran away from it and I found that hard to take. We had a difficult relationship, but it was all right in the end. I went to Switzerland and we said what we had to say and we made our peace. I'm really glad I did that. It was such a release for both of us".

Corré organised his father's funeral, at which McLaren was buried in a coffin sprayed with the slogan "Too Fast To Live Too Young To Die" (the title of one of his shops). The ceremony was attended by celebrities including Bob Geldof and Tracey Emin, and accompanied by a public procession to punk songs, including the Sid Vicious version of "My Way". In 2012 probate was granted to Young Kim, McLaren's girlfriend during the last 16 years of his life, by McLaren's will, which Corré had contested because he was excluded from it.

Ownership of father's domain name
Corré is registered as the administrative officer of malcolmmclaren.com. In 2012 he bought the domain name from Paul August Nordstrom of Singapore for $750; August had worked for McLaren and in 1997 registered the domain to himself without McLaren's knowledge. August, who said in 2013 he could "no longer recall specifically why he placed his own name as registrant", had previously refused to pass the domain to the Malcolm McLaren Estate.

Politics
Prior to the 2015 general election, he was one of several celebrities who endorsed the parliamentary candidacy of the Green Party's Caroline Lucas. Together with his mother, he has publicly campaigned for the release of WikiLeaks publisher and journalist Julian Assange.

2016 protest
In November 2016 in a staged protest to encourage use of renewable energy, Corré and Vivienne Westwood burned an estimated £6,000,000 worth of his punk rock memorabilia archive on a barge on the River Thames.  When asked about the incident by The Sunday Telegraph, "Did this feel like burning a Picasso?", Corré replied "I don’t know what burning a Picasso feels like," adding, "but I thought that was great. Punk rock is not important. Punk has become another marketing tool to sell you something you don’t need".

Musician Henry Rollins wrote in response to the incident, "Corré and Westwood might think they have taught everyone a lesson in what punk’s all about, but all they did was show off their massive egos and how much they’ve lost the plot. Maybe it was something else, too. Perhaps it was an emotional response to the fact that McLaren cut Corré out of his will. It doesn’t matter now. It’s yesterday’s garbage. Ooh, how punk."

References

External links
 Agent Provocateur
 
 Mister Fancy Pants Fights Back
 Lingerie firm founder rejects MBE 
 Vogue article - Like Mother, Like Son

1967 births
Living people
People from Clapham
English Sephardi Jews
English fashion designers
English businesspeople
English people of Portuguese-Jewish descent